Békési Férfi Kézilabda Club  is a Hungarian handball club from Békés, that played in the  Nemzeti Bajnokság I/B, the second level championship in Hungary.

Crest, colours, supporters

Naming history

Kits

Management

Team

Current squad 

Squad for the 2021–22 season

Technical staff
 Head coach:  József Padla
 Goalkeeping coach:  Attila Szikora
 Masseur:  Imre Kardos
 Club Doctor:  Dr. László Magyar

Transfers

Transfers for the 2021–22 season

Joining 

  Ákos Lele (LB) from  Orosházi FKSE
  Miksa Hrabák (LW) from  Budakalász FKC
  Olivér Kiss (GK) from  Kecskeméti TE
  Gábor Laufer (CB) from  KK Ajka
  Márk Dávid (LP) from  NEKA

Leaving 

  László Pajkó (GK) to  Orosházi FKSE
  András Gál (CB) to  Ózdi KC

Honours

Recent seasons

Seasons in Nemzeti Bajnokság I: 5
Seasons in Nemzeti Bajnokság I/B: 23
Seasons in Nemzeti Bajnokság II 1

Former club members

Notable former players

  Gábor Ancsin (2004–2005)
  József Czina (2005–2007, 2020–)
  Mátyás Győri (2007–2013)
  Ákos Lele (2021–)
  Kornél Nagy (2002–2005)
  Gábor Oláh (2005–2008, 2016–2020)
  Levente Szabó (2005–2006)
  Norbert Visy (2004)
  Marius Novanc (2002–2004)
  Borislav Basaric (2005–2006)
  Igor Milicevic (2005–2006)
  Vladimir Zelic (2005–2006)

Former coaches

References

External links
 Official website  
 

Hungarian handball clubs
Békés County